Lyons Township is a township in Mills County, Iowa, USA.

History
Lyons Township was organized in 1857.

References

Townships in Mills County, Iowa
Townships in Iowa
1857 establishments in Iowa
Populated places established in 1857